The 1992 Milan–San Remo was the 83rd edition of the Milan–San Remo cycle race and was held on 21 March 1992. The race started in Milan and finished in San Remo. The race was won by Sean Kelly of the Lotus–Festina team.

General classification

References

1992
1992 in road cycling
1992 in Italian sport
Milan-San Remo
Milan-San Remo